Nick Hodgson (born 26 November 1964) is a British swimmer.

Swimming career
Hodgson competed at the 1984 Summer Olympics and the 1988 Summer Olympics. He represented England in the 200 metres butterfly, at the 1982 Commonwealth Games in Brisbane, Queensland, Australia. Four years later she represented England and won a bronze medal in the 200 metres butterfly, at the 1986 Commonwealth Games in Edinburgh, Scotland. He also won the ASA National Championship title in the 200 metres butterfly in 1985 and 1986.

References

External links
 

1964 births
Living people
British male swimmers
Olympic swimmers of Great Britain
Swimmers at the 1984 Summer Olympics
Swimmers at the 1988 Summer Olympics
Sportspeople from Blackburn
Commonwealth Games medallists in swimming
Commonwealth Games bronze medallists for England
Swimmers at the 1982 Commonwealth Games
Swimmers at the 1986 Commonwealth Games
20th-century British people
Medallists at the 1986 Commonwealth Games